Suburbia is a book by Bill Owens, a photojournalism monograph on suburbia, published in 1973 by Straight Arrow Press, the former book publishing imprint of Rolling Stone. A revised edition was published in 1999, by Fotofolio.

Response
The Los Angeles Times commented that the book 
"...rouses pity, contempt, laughter and self-recognition. Owens’ influence was immense during the 1970s especially in respect to the kind of portraiture that shows the middle class."

In 2001, Suburbia was included in Andrew Roth’s The Book Of 101 Books: Seminal Photographic Books of the Twentieth Century.

References
"The American Dream, Circa 1970: Suburbia Photographs Capture How Much We've Changed",  Frank Ahrens, Washington Post, March 24, 2000

External links

Suburbia online gallery at the California Museum of Photography website
Suburbia online gallery at the Brigham Young University website
Suburbia at Life Magazine website
 Bill Owens. Vine Cinema, 1722 First Street, Livermore billboard, Everything You Always Wanted to Know About Sex* (*But Were Afraid to Ask), from Suburbia, 1969-72 - MutualArt

1973 non-fiction books
Photographic collections and books
Works about suburbs
Straight Arrow Press books